San Antonio is a settlement in Mitú Municipality, Vaupés Department Department in Colombia.

Climate
San Antonio has a very wet tropical rainforest climate (Af) with heavy to very heavy rainfall year-round.

References

Populated places in the Vaupés Department